The 2016–17 Valparaiso Crusaders men's basketball team represented Valparaiso University during the 2016–17 NCAA Division I men's basketball season. The Crusaders, led by first-year head coach Matt Lottich, played their home games at the Athletics–Recreation Center as members of the Horizon League. They finished the season 24–9, 14–4 in Horizon League play to finish in a tie for the Horizon League regular season championship. As the No. 2 seed in the Horizon League tournament, they lost to Milwaukee in the quarterfinals. They received an invitation to the National Invitation Tournament where they lost in the first round to Illinois.

This was the Crusaders' final season as a member of the Horizon League as the school announced on May 25, 2017 that it would be joining the Missouri Valley Conference effective July 1, 2017.

Previous season
The Crusaders finished the 2015–16 season 30–7, 16–2 in Horizon League play to win the regular season championship. They lost in the semifinals of the Horizon League tournament to Green Bay. As a regular season conference champion who failed to win their conference tournament, the Crusaders received an automatic bid to the National Invitation Tournament. As one of the last four teams left out of the NCAA tournament, they received a No. 1 seed in the NIT where they defeated Texas Southern, Florida State, Saint Mary's, and BYU to advance to the championship game where they lost to George Washington.

This season marked Bryce Drew's final season as Valparaiso head coach. He accepted the Vanderbilt head coaching job on April 5, 2016. He finished at Valpo with a five-year record of 124–49 and went to the postseason every year as head coach. On April 7, the school promoted assistant coach Matt Lottich to head coach.

Offseason

Departures

Incoming Transfers

2016 recruiting class

2017 recruiting class

Preseason 
In a poll of the League’s coaches, media, and sports information directors, Valparaiso was picked to win the conference, receiving 35 of the 39 first-place votes. Alec Peters was named the Preseason Horizon League player of the year. Shane Hammink was also named to the Preseason All-Horizon League second team.

Roster

Schedule and results

|-
!colspan=9 style=| Exhibition

|-
!colspan=9 style=| Non-conference regular season

|-
!colspan=9 style=| Horizon League regular season

|-
!colspan=9 style=|Horizon League tournament

|-
!colspan=9 style=|NIT

References

Valparaiso
Valparaiso Beacons men's basketball seasons
Valparaiso
Valparaiso Crusaders men's basket
Valparaiso Crusaders men's basket